Gary George Alexander (born 15 August 1979 in Lambeth) is an English former professional footballer. He was recently interim manager of Cray Wanderers.

Alexander previously played for West Ham United, Exeter City, Swindon Town, Hull City, Leyton Orient, Millwall, Brentford, Crawley Town, AFC Wimbledon and Burton Albion. He was also caretaker manager of Crawley Town alongside Martin Hinshelwood.

Career

West Ham United and Exeter City
He began his career with West Ham United, but his first taste of first team football came with a loan spell at Exeter City in the 1999–2000 season. Alexander scored 16 goals in 37 league games for the Grecians and although he was only on-loan to Exeter, became their Player of the Season. His form with Exeter convinced Swindon Town to sign him from West Ham for £300,000 in July 2000.

Swindon Town
Alexander's time at Swindon was short. He played only one season, scoring seven goals in 43 appearances in all competitions.

Hull City
With Swindon Town in financial difficulties they accepted a bid from Hull City in June 2001. His first season saw him score 20 goals in 47 appearances in all competitions and in the 2001–02 season he was awarded the Hull City Player of the Season award.

Leyton Orient
In January 2003 he moved to Leyton Orient where he soon became a first team regular. Alexander rejected a new deal in May 2007.

Millwall

On 24 May 2009 Alexander scored twice for Millwall in the 2008–09 League One play-off final. However, he was unable to prevent Millwall losing 3–2 to Scunthorpe United, despite Alexander's two goals giving Millwall a 2–1 half-time lead. He missed a chance to put Millwall 3–1 up and claim his hat-trick.

Brentford

In August 2010 Alexander signed for Brentford for an undisclosed fee and made his debut on 7 August against Carlisle United. He scored his first Brentford goal a week later in a 2–1 home defeat to Walsall. On 28 January 2012 Alexander scored a hat-trick in a 5–2 win over Wycombe Wanderers.

Crawley Town
In March 2012 Alexander signed on loan for Crawley Town until the end of the 2011–12 season. Alexander scored seven goals in fourteen appearances for Crawley as they finished 3rd in League Two and were promoted to League One. Following the sacking of manager Ritchie Barker, Alexander became caretaker manager on 28 November 2013, alongside chief scout Martin Hinshelwood.

AFC Wimbledon
On 31 January 2013 Alexander joined AFC Wimbledon, on loan until the end of the season. He scored three goals in 18 appearances, the last of which was the first in a 2–1 win over Fleetwood Town on 27 April 2013, the final day of the season, that preserved the Dons' Football League status.

Burton Albion
On 31 January 2014, Alexander signed for Burton Albion. He was released by the club at the end of the season.

Coaching career
Alexander joined Greenwich Borough in July 2014. On 22 December 2015, Alexander became player-manager. He guided them to promotion from the Southern Counties East in 2015–16 and the following season they reached the Isthmian League South Division play-offs. He left the club in January 2018.

After turning out for Chatham Town for a couple of matches, Alexander joined Ashford United in mid-January 2018, initially as assistant manager team but with a view to becoming manager for the following season. He was sacked in November 2018. After a spell scouting for Millwall, he was appointed manager of Glebe in September 2019. Alexander resigned from this role in June 2021.

In December 2021, Alexander was appointed assistant to Interim Manager Grant Basey at Isthmian League Premier Division side Cray Wanderers.

Career statistics

Honours

As a player 
Leyton Orient

 Football League Two third-place promotion: 2005–06

Millwall

 Football League One play-offs: 2010

Crawley Town

 Football League Two third-place promotion: 2011–12

Greenwich Borough

 Southern Counties East League: 2015–16

As a manager 
Greenwich Borough

 Southern Counties East League: 2015–16

As an individual 

 Exeter City Player of the Year: 1999–00
 Hull City Player of the Year: 2001–02

References

External links
 

1979 births
Living people
Footballers from Lambeth
English footballers
Association football forwards
Swindon Town F.C. players
Leyton Orient F.C. players
Hull City A.F.C. players
Exeter City F.C. players
West Ham United F.C. players
Millwall F.C. players
Brentford F.C. players
Crawley Town F.C. players
AFC Wimbledon players
Burton Albion F.C. players
English Football League players
English Football League managers
English football managers
Isthmian League players
Crawley Town F.C. managers
Greenwich Borough F.C. players
Greenwich Borough F.C. managers
Chatham Town F.C. players
Ashford United F.C. players
Ashford United F.C. managers
Millwall F.C. non-playing staff
Glebe F.C. managers